Mazraeh Emam (also Romanized as Mazra‘eh Emam) is a village in Bafran Rural District, in the Central District of Nain County, Isfahan Province, Iran. At the 2006 census, its population was 851, in 255 families.

References 

Populated places in Nain County